Laurel Hubbard (born 9 February 1978) is a New Zealand weightlifter. Selected to compete at the 2020 Summer Olympics, she was the first openly transgender woman to compete in the Olympic Games. Prior to making her Olympic debut, Hubbard achieved a ranking of 7th in the IWF's women's +87 kg division.

Career 

While competing in male competitive categories before coming out as transgender, Hubbard set New Zealand junior records in 1998 in the newly established M105+ division in both lifts (snatch 135 kg, clean & jerk 170 kg) as well as total (300 kg). Those records were later surpassed by David Liti. Hubbard has spoken against what she calls "one of the misconceptions that's out there" that she had been training all her life before she transitioned, stating that she ceased lifting in 2001, explaining, "it just became too much to bear ... just the pressure of trying to fit into a world that perhaps wasn't really set up for people like myself".

In 2012, Hubbard transitioned to female. She began hormone therapy that year. Hubbard competed in international weightlifting for the first time in 2017.

At the 2017 Australian International & Australian Open in Melbourne, she competed at the heaviest 90 kg+ category, winning the gold medal with a 123 kg snatch and 145 kg clean & jerk, for a total of 268 kg at a bodyweight of 131.83 kg. She thus became the first trans woman to win an international weightlifting title for New Zealand. Although Hubbard met eligibility requirements to compete, her win was met with criticism, with some other competitors saying the competition was unfair. Athletes that were critical of the decision to allow Hubbard to compete include Iuniarra Sipaia, Toafitu Perive, Deborah Acason and Tracey Lambrechs.  Australian Weightlifting Federation's chief executive, Michael Keelan, said it was unfair to other competitors.

Hubbard qualified for the 2018 Commonwealth Games, but an elbow injury during the competition forced her withdrawal from the event while leading the field. After the injury, Hubbard announced her probable retirement from weightlifting.

Hubbard later returned to the sport, winning two gold medals at the 2019 Pacific Games in Samoa. The decision to allow Hubbard to compete was subsequently criticised by the Samoa 2019 chairman, Loau Solamalemalo Keneti Sio, and Samoa's Prime Minister, Tuilaepa Aiono Sailele Malielegaoi.

In 2020 qualification event, she won the gold medal in the women's +87kg event at the Roma 2020 World Cup in Rome, Italy.

2020 Olympics 

The International Olympic Committee (IOC) let the International Weightlifting Federation (IWF) set the requirements for transgender weightlifters to compete at the Olympics. Hubbard met all the requirements and on 21 June 2021, the New Zealand Olympic Committee (NZOC) confirmed that Hubbard had been selected for the New Zealand Olympic team to compete in the women's +87 kilogram category, becoming the oldest weightlifter to qualify for the games. This decision resulted in Hubbard becoming the first openly transgender athlete to be selected to compete in weightlifting at the Olympic Games. Transgender athletes have been allowed to compete at the Olympics since 2004, with the current criteria in place since 2015.

The inclusion of Hubbard was welcomed by supporters within the trans community as a step towards more inclusion at the Games. It was criticised by others. Some athletes, scientists and campaigners said that she had a biological advantage due to going through male puberty. Weightlifters including  Anna Van Bellinghen and Tracey Lambrechs were critical of Hubbard's selection,  Charisma Amoe-Tarrant, who qualified in the same category, supported Hubbard's participation. There were public expressions of support from New Zealand Prime Minister, Jacinda Ardern, and sport minister Grant Robertson. The IOC's Medical and Scientific Director Richard Budgett, has advocated for more research into trans participation in sports.

At 43 she was the fourth oldest weightlifter to compete at the Olympics and was seen as a medal contender. In front of a large contingent of media Hubbard struggled, with three failed snatch lifts, placing last in her group. Afterwards she thanked the IOC, IWF, NZOC and all her supporters in New Zealand for their encouragement and help throughout the competition. Later Hubbard hinted at retirement, saying that age has caught up with her.

Major results

Personal life 
Hubbard's father is Dick Hubbard, a former Mayor of Auckland City and the founder of Hubbard Foods.

In 2017, Hubbard told an interviewer that she began participating in weight lifting when she was living as male because she hoped it would enable her to become masculine.

Hubbard rarely gives interviews to the media. Commenting on criticism she receives for participating in women's weightlifting as a transgender athlete, Hubbard said in 2017, 

Medalbox notes

References

External links 
 

1978 births
Living people
New Zealand female weightlifters
Transgender sportswomen
Transgender women
New Zealand transgender people
New Zealand LGBT sportspeople
World Weightlifting Championships medalists
Weightlifters at the 2018 Commonwealth Games
Commonwealth Games competitors for New Zealand
LGBT weightlifters
Sportspeople from Auckland
Weightlifters at the 2020 Summer Olympics
Olympic weightlifters of New Zealand